Palette Records was an independent record label, founded in Belgium in 1958 by Jacques Kluger. It was linked to the publishing company World Music, which was taken over by BMG Universal Music in 1989.

The British Palette label was distributed by Pye Records.  Artists included the comedian Tommy Cooper, who had a minor hit with "Don't Jump off the Roof, Dad", Monty Babson, and the Reg Owen Orchestra, whose single "Manhattan Spiritual" reached #10 on the U.S. pop chart in 1959.

Artists

Tommy Cooper
Reg Owen
Monty Babson
Will Tura
Rita Deneve
Jess and James
Los Mayas
Andre Brasseur
The Mertens Brothers

See also
 List of record labels

References

British record labels
Belgian record labels
Pop record labels